The Australia women's national handball team is the national handball team of Australia. It is governed by the Australian Handball Federation, and takes part in international handball competitions.

Tournaments

Olympic Games

World Championship

Asian Championship

Oceania Nations Cup

Current squad
Squad for the 2019 World Women's Handball Championship.

Head coach: Heba Aly

References

External links

IHF profile

Women's national handball teams
Handball
National team